4923 Clarke, provisional designation , is a stony background asteroid from the inner regions of the asteroid belt, approximately  in diameter. It was discovered on 2 March 1981, by American astronomer Schelte Bus at the Siding Spring Observatory in Australia. The spheroidal S-type asteroid has a rotation period of 3.14 hours. It was named after British science fiction writer Arthur C. Clarke. On the same night, Schelte Bus also discovered 5020 Asimov.

Orbit and classification 

Clarke is a non-family asteroid from the main belt's background population. It orbits the Sun in the inner main-belt at a distance of 1.7–2.6 AU once every 3 years and 2 months (1,147 days; semi-major axis of 2.14 AU). Its orbit has an eccentricity of 0.20 and an inclination of 7° with respect to the ecliptic.

The body's observation arc begins at the Siding Spring Observatory two weeks prior to its official discovery observation on 12 February 1981.

Physical characteristics 

In the SMASS classification, Clarke is a common, stony S-type asteroid.

Rotation period 

Three rotational lightcurves of Clarke have been obtained from photometric observations by the APT Observatory Group in Spain, by astronomers at the Palomar Transient Factory in California, and by Czech astronomer Petr Pravec at Ondřejov Observatory. Analysis of the best-rated lightcurve gave a rotation period of 3.143 hours with a consolidated brightness amplitude between 0.03 and 0.14 magnitude, which indicates that the body has a nearly spheroidal, non-elongated shape.

Diameter and albedo 

According to the survey carried out by the NEOWISE mission of NASA's Wide-field Infrared Survey Explorer, Clarke measures between 3.367 and 3.532 kilometers in diameter and its surface has an albedo between 0.3259 and 0.366. The Collaborative Asteroid Lightcurve Link assumes an albedo of 0.20 and calculates a diameter of 4.10 kilometers based on an absolute magnitude of 14.3.

Naming 

This minor planet was named after the science fiction writer Arthur C. Clarke (1917–2008), author of 2001: A Space Odyssey. The official naming citation was prepared with assistance from Richard Binzel and published by the Minor Planet Center on 3 May 1996. The asteroid's name independently suggested by Duncan Steel.

In the postscript to his novel 3001: The Final Odyssey, Clarke jokingly expresses disappointment that he did not receive asteroid 2001 as his namesake; instead, it was named for Albert Einstein.

Notes

References

External links 
 Asteroid Lightcurve Database (LCDB), query form (info )
 Dictionary of Minor Planet Names, Google books
 Discovery Circumstances: Numbered Minor Planets (1)-(5000) – Minor Planet Center
 
 

004923
Discoveries by Schelte J. Bus
Named minor planets
4923 Clarke
004923
19810302